Mondipalayam is a village located in Bhavani taluk, Erode district, Tamil Nadu, India. The village falls under the Mylambadi panchayat. Mondipalayam of Tiruppur district is different from this.

Description
This village is home to about 50 families. The primary occupations are agriculture and sand quarrying. Agricultural land in this area is very fertile and crops like ground nut, corn, sugar cane and turmeric grow well.  Most of the families are affiliated to the Kongu Vellala Gounder community, a sect under Hinduism.

A large lake with waters touching the brim is the pinnacle to the wellbeing of the villagers. It serves as a water reserve and is used for irrigational purposes. During summer the temperature shoots up to a maximum of 40ْ c and during winter it is as low as 18ْ C.

The villagers worship the goddess Mariamman. Her temple is located in the middle of the village and every year during the month of January, they celebrate the Mariamman Festival. This festivity takes place for about a week and during this time the villagers offer the goddess with rituals and other customary offerings. This is to ensure that the goddess protects the village from evil demons and also provide prosperity and wellbeing.

Temples
Mondipalayam is surrounded by well known temples like "Karumalai Aandavar Temple", "Karikaali Amman Temple". These temples draw huge crowds during the festive season.

Demographics

As of 2001 India census, Mondipalayam had a population of 843. Males constitute 50% of the population and females 50%. Mondipalayam has an average literacy rate of 81%, higher than the national average of 59.5%; with male literacy of 96% and female literacy of 84%.

Access
The nearest Railway station is at Erode and is located at a distance of 26 km.  This village is well connected to other cities and towns through the SH1 (State Highways) road network.

Nearest airports to the village are:
	Coimbatore Airport (107 km)
	Tiruchirapalli Airport (173 km)
	Salem Airport (75 km)

References

Villages in Erode district